SESI São Paulo, a.k.a. SESI-SP, is a Brazilian professional volleyball team based in São Paulo, Brazil. They compete in the Brazilian Superliga and were the 2010–11 national league champions and 2011 South American champions.

Team
Team roster – season 2019/2020

Honors 
Brazilian Superliga
  (x1) 2010–11
  (x4) 2013–14, 2014–15, 2017–18, 2018–19
 Brazilian Super Cup
  (x1) 2018
 Paulista Championship
  (x4) 2009, 2011, 2012, 2013
 South American Championship
  (x1) 2011

See also
 Serviço Social da Indústria-SP (women's volleyball) - Women's team

References

External links
 Official website

Brazilian volleyball clubs
Sports teams in São Paulo
Volleyball clubs in São Paulo (state)